Juan Gregorio Bazán (1510-1570) was a Spanish military man, who served as Conquistador of Peru and Tucumán.

Biography 

Bazán was born in 1510 in Talavera de la Reina, Toledo, Castilla–La Mancha, Spain, the son of a distinguished family. He arrived to America, with its relative the Conqueror Francisco de Aguirre. 

Bazan lived in several places belonging to the Spanish Empire, including Panama and Chile. In the Peru, he join to the forces of Pablo de Meneses, against Captain Francisco Pizarro. In 1568 he took part of a contingent to explore the area Río Bermejo. 

In 1570 Juan Gregorio Bazán traveled ciudad de Los Reyes (Lima), for reunited with his wife Catalina de Placencia, and sons. Return to Chile, he and family were ambushed by the tribes Humaguacas and Puquiles. Bazán dies in the incursion, his wife and children manage to survive after finding refuge in the mountains.

Juan Gregorio Bazán participated in the foundations of Ciudad de Cañete, San Juan Bautista de la Rivera and San Miguel de Tucumán.

References

External links 
www.bn.gov.ar

Spanish nobility
Spanish military personnel
People from the Province of Toledo
Spanish conquistadors
Explorers of South America
Spanish colonial governors and administrators
1510 births
1570 deaths